Superpredators may refer to:

 Superpredator, a type of criminal in superpredator myth
 "Superpredators (Metal Postcard)", a 1997 song by British musical group Massive Attack
 Apex predator, a predator at the top of a food chain

See also 
 Apex Predator (disambiguation)
 Predator (disambiguation)